Ian McCallum (born 1944) is a former rugby union player. From 1970 to 1974, he played 11 matches as fullback for the Springboks, the South African national rugby union team.

After his playing career, he became a psychiatrist, author and wilderness guide, and co-founder of the Wilderness Leadership School in the Western Cape, South Africa.

Rugby career
McCallum played provincial rugby for Western Province from 1968 until 1972. He then moved to Natal and though he never played for Natal, he was selected for South Africa during the 1974 season.

McCallum's first test for the Springboks was in 1970 against the New Zealand at Loftus Versfeld in Pretoria. He played in all four tests in the 1970 series against the touring All Blacks. He also played in the test series against France and Australia in 1971 and against the British Lions in 1974. Both he and his brother, Roy, were in the Springbok team for the first Test against the British Lions at Newlands in 1974. McCallum played a further six tour matches, scoring seventy-two points for the Springboks.

Test history

See also
List of South Africa national rugby union players – Springbok no. 443

References

External links

Alumni of Rondebosch Boys' High School
South Africa international rugby union players
Rugby union fullbacks
1944 births
Living people
South African psychiatrists
University of Cape Town alumni
Western Province (rugby union) players